The Stardust Award for Best Director – Thriller/Action is a contest held by Stardust Magazine, a monthly Bollywood and gossip magazine. It is published in English and Hindi, to honor outstanding direction for thriller and action films. The individual chosen to receive the award is elected by the readers of the magazine. It is not an annual award given by the magazine, but is only awarded when an individual's direction of thriller or action films makes a significant impact. 

Here is a list of film and the award winners.

See also 
 Stardust Awards
 Thriller films
 Action films 
 Bollywood
 Cinema of India

References 

Stardust Awards